The 2017–18 season was Sheffield Wednesday's sixth consecutive season in the Championship. Along with competing in the Championship, the club also participated in the FA Cup and EFL Cup.

The season covers the period from 1 July 2017 to 30 June 2018.

Overview

August
Sheffield Wednesday kicked off their 2017–18 campaign with an away game against Preston North End, which they lost 1–0. This was followed by a 4–1 win against Chesterfield in the first round of the EFL Cup, which was The Owls' first game of the season at Hillsborough. A few days later, Sheffield Wednesday's first home league game of the season ended in a 1–1 draw against Queens Park Rangers, with Sam Winnall scoring an equalising goal in the second half. Another 1–1 draw at home followed, with David Jones scoring his first goal for the club to equalise against the recently relegated Sunderland.

The Owls' first league win of the season came against Fulham, with Owls striker Steven Fletcher scoring the only goal of the game. The Owls' final game of the month was a disappointing 1–1 draw at the Pirelli Stadium against Burton Albion followed, leaving Wednesday in 16th place in the league with six points.

September
The Owls started September with a home game against Nottingham Forest, which they won 3–1 with goals from Steven Fletcher, Gary Hooper and Kieran Lee (his first game upon return from injury) respectively. A few days later, Wednesday defeated Brentford 2–1 at home, with Gary Hooper and Ross Wallace both scoring. Up next was an away game at Cardiff City, with The Owls denied a win after a last second equalising goal. A heavy 4–2 loss followed in the home fixture of the Steel City derby, and Wednesday would again lose in their next game away at struggling Birmingham City, who earned only their second win of the season by defeating Wednesday 1–0 to leave them 14th in the Championship.

October
At the start of October, Sheffield Wednesday beat local rivals Leeds United 3–0 at Hillsborough, thanks to a brace from Gary Hooper and a goal from Kieran Lee. Two successive away defeats to Bolton Wanderers and Derby County respectively followed, with the next home game resulting in a 1–1 draw against local rivals Barnsley. In their fifth and final game in October, Wednesday earned a 2–1 win at home against Millwall, with Adam Reach and Jordan Rhodes scoring for The Owls.

November
Wednesday started November with an away match at Villa Park, which ended in another 2–1 win for The Owls after winger Adam Reach and striker Jordan Rhodes both scored for the second game on the run. This match would ultimately prove to be the final victory at the club for manager Carlos Carvalhal, with Sheffield Wednesday failing to win another game during the rest of November, with three consecutive draws against Bristol City at Hillsborough and Ipswich Town and Reading away respectively.

December
December started with a 2–2 draw at Hillsborough against Hull City, with The Owls being denied the points in the very last minute of the game. Three consecutive losses followed to continue The Owls' disappointing run, losing 3–1 away at Norwich City away, 1–0 to Wolves and 2–1 to Middlesbrough at Hillsborough, with the latter being Carlos Carvalhal's final game in charge of the club. The Portuguese left the club by mutual consent on Christmas Eve, after two and a half seasons at the helm of the club.

Lee Bullen was appointed caretaker manager until a permanent appointment is made. Bullen's first came as caretaker resulted in a 3–0 victory over Nottingham Forest, with goals from Adam Reach, Jordan Rhodes and Lucas João. The Owls' final game of 2017 resulted in a 2–0 loss to Brentford at Griffin Park.

January
The Owls got off to a poor start in 2018, with a heavy 3–0 defeat at Hillsborough against Burton Albion.

On 5 January 2018, The Owls unveiled Jos Luhukay as the new manager of the club. For The Owls' game in the FA Cup Third Round against Carlisle United, which ended as disappointing goalless draw, Luhukay watched from the crowd. Luhukay's first game in charge of the club was the reverse leg of the Steel City derby at Bramall Lane, which ended in a goalless draw and saw the dismissal of captain Glenn Loovens sent off after he received two yellow cards.

Sheffield Wednesday's first victory of 2018 came in their FA Cup Third Round replay at Hillsborough, which Wednesday won 2–0 after Marco Matias and Atdhe Nuhiu both found the target for The Owls. The reverse league fixture against Cardiff City ended in another goalless draw, despite Adam Reach, Jordan Rhodes and Lucas João all having opportunities to score. Wednesday then faced Reading at home in the Fourth Round of the FA Cup, which ended in a 3–1 victory for The Owls, thanks to a brace from striker Atdhe Nuhiu and winger George Boyd's first goal for the club.

January ended in another goalless draw in the league for The Owls, this time against Middlesbrough at The Riverside Stadium.

February
Wednesday lost their first league game of February, which was a 3–1 defeat at Hillsborough against Birmingham City. A 1–1 away draw against Barnsley followed, with The Owls picking up their only league win of the month, a 2–0 home win, against Derby County. The Owls then faced former manager Carlos Carvalhal's new team Swansea City in the Fifth Round of the FA Cup, earning a replay after a 0–0 draw at Hillsborough.

Two successive league defeats followed, 2–1 away against Millwall and 4–2 at home against Aston Villa, with The Owls being 2–1 at half time in the latter. The Owls then bowed out of the FA Cup after losing 2–0 in their FA Cup replay against Swansea City.

March
March saw Wednesday's poor form in the league continue, losing 4–0 to Bristol City and 2–1 to Ipswich Town, the former being The Owls' heaviest defeat of the season. A 1–1 draw against Bolton Wanderers at Hillsborough followed, before The Owls defeated fierce local rivals Leeds 2–1 thanks to a brace from Atdhe Nuhiu, who scored the winning goal in extra time. Sheffield Wednesday then won 4–1 at home against Preston North End, with Atdhe Nuhiu scoring twice and a goal each from Lucas João and Fernando Forestieri.

April
In Sheffield Wednesday's first league game of April, they won 3–1 at the Stadium of Light, with Lucas João, vice captain Tom Lees and Atdhe Nuhiu all scoring. Two successive losses followed, 1–0 against promotion challengers Fulham and 4–2 against Queens Park Rangers.

Wednesday then won their next two league games, with a rare Jordan Rhodes goal against Hull City enough to earn The Owls three points. In the next league fixture, which was against Reading at Hillsborough, Fernando Forestieri scored a brace with George Boyd also scoring in a 3–0 win. The final game of April was a 0–0 draw with Wolves.

May
Sheffield Wednesday ended the 2017/18 season with a 5–1 win over Norwich City at Hillsborough, with Atdhe Nuhiu scoring a hattrick and Fernando Forestieri and on-loan central defender Frederico Venâncio scoring a goal each. It was also Owls captain Glenn Loovens' final game for the club, with his contract expiring at the end of the season.

Player transfers & contracts

Transfers in

Transfers out

Loans in

Loans out

New contracts

Competitions

Friendlies
As of 12 July 2017, Sheffield Wednesday have announced seven pre-season friendlies against Alfreton Town, Mansfield Town, Doncaster Rovers, Portimonense, Vitória de Setúbal Farense and Rangers.

Championship

League table

Results summary

Results by matchday

Matches
On 21 June 2017, the league fixtures were announced.

August

September

October

November

December

January

February

March

April

May

FA Cup
In the FA Cup, Sheffield Wednesday entered the competition in the third round and were drawn away to Carlisle United. The first game ended in a goalless draw, with the replay taking place at Hillsborough on 16 January. In the Fourth Round, The Owls were drawn against Reading at home.

On 29 January 2018, Sheffield Wednesday were drawn against either Notts County or Swansea City in the Fifth Round draw.

EFL Cup
On 16 June 2017, Sheffield Wednesday were drawn at home to Chesterfield in the first round. After winning their first-round game, The Owls were drawn against fellow EFL Championship side Bolton Wanderers on 10 August 2017.

Squad statistics

Appearances

|-
|colspan="12" style="text-align:center;" |Players currently out on loan

|}

Goalscorers

Includes all competitive matches.

Disciplinary record

Clean sheets

Awards

Player of the Month
Player of the Month awards for the 2017–18 season.

Player of the Year

References

Sheffield Wednesday
Sheffield Wednesday F.C. seasons